In mathematics, the Chazy equation is the differential equation

One solution is given by the Eisenstein series

Acting on this solution by the group SL2 gives a 3-parameter family of solutions.

References

Ordinary differential equations